Doratifera quadriguttata, the four-spotted cup moth, is a moth of the family Limacodidae. The species was first described by Francis Walker in 1855. It is found in Australia.

The larvae feed on Tristaniopsis laurina, Lophostemon confertus, Rhizophora stylosa and Acacia and Eucalyptus species.

References

Limacodidae
Moths described in 1855
Taxa named by Francis Walker (entomologist)
Moths of Australia